Highway 679 is a highway in the Canadian province of Saskatchewan. It runs from Highway 349 near Nobleville to Highway 23 near Bjorkdale.

Highway 679 passes near Greenwater Lake Provincial Park and Marean Lake Resort. Marean Lake is accessible from the highway and Greenwater Provincial Park is off Highway 38. Highway 679 also has a four-kilometre Concurrency with Highway 773 just east of Pré-Ste-Marié.

See also 
Roads in Saskatchewan
Transportation in Saskatchewan

References 

679